Hurricane Maria was an Atlantic hurricane which formed in September 2005 during the annual hurricane season. Maria was the thirteenth named storm, sixth hurricane, and fourth major hurricane of the record-breaking season. Maria formed in the central Atlantic on September 1 and tracked to the northwest, strengthening as it moved over warm waters. The storm reached its peak intensity on September 5 east of Bermuda and gradually weakened before becoming extratropical on September 10. Maria did not affect any land as a tropical cyclone, but Maria brought tropical storm-force winds to Iceland as an extratropical cyclone and produced heavy rain and three fatalities in Norway.

Meteorological history

A powerful tropical wave moved off the coast of Africa on August 27. As it moved west into the Atlantic, it became more organized and the system developed into Tropical Depression Fourteen about midway between Cape Verde and the Lesser Antilles on September 1. Shear from an upper-level low to the southwest slowed the development of the storm and caused uncertainties in the National Hurricane Center's forecasts, as some models indicated that the depression would dissipate and others that it would become a hurricane. The depression gradually strengthened as it moved to the northwest across the open Atlantic Ocean, becoming Tropical Storm Maria on September 2 and reaching hurricane strength on September 4.

In the central Atlantic, Hurricane Maria continued to strengthen in favorable conditions, and on September 5 briefly became a Category 3 hurricane with 115 mph (185 km/h) winds while 480 miles (770 km) east of Bermuda. Increasing shear and cooler waters caused the storm to rapidly weaken to a minimal hurricane on September 7. Operationally, the NHC believed that Maria had briefly weakened further into a tropical storm, but post-season analysis confirmed this did not occur.

As Hurricane Maria moved to the northeast the official forecasts called for the storm to continue to weaken slowly but an interaction with an upper-level trough caused Maria to strengthen again. It was also predicted that the storm would rapidly become extratropical, but Maria retained tropical characteristics for 48 hours longer than some forecasts indicated. Maria weakened into a tropical storm on September 9 before finally becoming extratropical about midway between the Azores and Newfoundland early on September 10.

The extratropical system intensified considerably, achieving hurricane intensity once again on September 11 at about 52°N, with a minimum pressure of 962 mbar (hPa) — equal to its minimum pressure as a tropical cyclone. It passed just to the south of Iceland on September 13 as a hurricane-strength extratropical system (although the center stayed offshore). As the storm approached Norway on September 14 it merged with another strong extratropical system.

Impact and records

While Maria remained far from the U.S. East Coast, rip currents caused by the combined effects of the distant Maria and the closer Hurricane Nate (which was near Bermuda at the time) killed one person and seriously injured another in New Jersey.

Maria never approached any land areas while a tropical system, but tracked toward northern Europe after becoming an extratropical storm on September 10. The first land effects were felt in Iceland on September 12, where tropical storm-force winds were reported. The strongest winds were recorded in Vestmannaeyjar where sustained winds in excess of 67 mph (107 km/h) were reported as well as a minimum pressure of 979 mbar. The storm then brushed the northernmost part of Scotland, with no reported damage there either. The extratropical Maria merged with another system and this storm made landfall in Norway. This storm brought tropical storm-force winds and heavy rainfall to that country, and caused flooding and several mudslides, particularly around Bergen, the most important of which occurred in Hatlestad. One person was killed immediately, at least nine others were injured, and numerous homes were destroyed. Marine interests were also affected, as a large number of ferries were docked in the Baltic Sea. On September 18, a woman died of injuries. Her daughter died on February 7, 2006, after having been kept alive in a respirator since the accident. After the storm, kr18.8 million (2005 NOK, $3.1 million in 2005 USD) in compensation was given for the damage.

When Maria developed on September 2, it was the earliest ever in a season that the 13th named tropical storm developed, beating the previous record held by Hurricane Thirteen of the 1933 season by six days. This record has since been broken by Hurricane Marco in 2020.

See also

Tropical cyclone effects in Europe
Other storms with the same name
List of Category 3 Atlantic hurricanes
List of New Jersey hurricanes
Hurricane Kate (2003)

References

External links

 
 NHC's archive on Hurricane Maria

Maria (2005)
2005 in Norway
2005 in Scotland
Maria (2005)
Maria (2005)
Maria (2005)
September 2005 events in Europe
Maria